The following are the football (soccer) events of the year 1964 throughout the world.

Events 
 The Estadio Nacional disaster in Peru claims the lives of 328 fans.
 SC Cambuur founded
 Copa Libertadores won by Independiente after defeating Nacional on an aggregate score of 1–0.
 September 16 – Dutch club DWS from Amsterdam makes its European debut by defeating Turkey's Fenerbahçe (3–1) in the first round of the European Cup, with two goals from Frans Geurtsen.
 September 23 – Fortuna '54 from Sittard  makes its European debut by losing to Italy's Torino (3–1) in the first round of the Cup Winners Cup. The only goal for the Dutch side is scored by the later coach Spitz Kohn.
1964 International Soccer League
League: Zagłębie Sosnowiec defeated SV Werder Bremen, 5–0 on aggregate.
Cup: FK Dukla Prague defeated Zagłębie Sosnowiec 4–2, on aggregate.

Winners club national championship

Asia 
 : Al-Maref

Europe 
 : Liverpool
 : AS Saint-Étienne
 : Bologna
 : DWS
 : Rangers
 : Real Madrid
 : Fenerbahçe
 : 1. FC Köln

North America
 : Chivas Guadalajara

South America 
 : Boca Juniors
 : Santos
 : Universidad de Chile
 : Club Guaraní

International tournaments 
 1964 British Home Championship (October 12, 1963 – April 11, 1964)

 1964 Taça de Nações (May 30 – June 7, 1964)

 1964 AFC Asian Cup in Israel (May 26 – June 3, 1964)
 
 
 
 UEFA European Football Championship in Spain (June 17–21, 1964)
 
 
 
 Olympic Games in Tokyo, Japan (October 11–23, 1964)

Births 

 January 8 – José Luis Carranza (Peruvian footballer)
 January 24 – Abraham Nava (Mexican footballer)
 March 5 – Gerald Vanenburg (Dutch international footballer)
 March 17 – Stefano Borgonovo (Italian footballer) (d. 2013)
 April 17 – Wisdom Mumba Chansa, Zambian footballer (d. 1993)
 May 12 – José Casanova Mendoza, Peruvian footballer (d. 1987)
 June 22 – Nico Jalink (Dutch footballer)
 June 30 – Ryszard Kraus (Polish international footballer) (d. 2013)
 July 9 – Gianluca Vialli, Italian football player and manger (d. 2023)
 July 30 – Jürgen Klinsmann (German international footballer and manager)
 August 5 – Raimonds Laizāns (Latvian footballer)
 August 20 – Giuseppe Giannini (Italian footballer)
 October 19 – Whiteson Changwe, Zambian international (d. 1993)
 October 25 – Johan de Kock (Dutch footballer)
 October 31 – Marco van Basten (Dutch international footballer)
 November 11 – Miguel Sanabria (Paraguayan footballer)
 November 12 – Thomas Berthold (German international footballer)
 November 24 – Hendrie Krüzen (Dutch footballer)
 November 28 
 Ken Charlery, St Lucian international  
 Naoto Hori, Japanese club footballer
 December 9 – Blas Cristaldo (Paraguayan footballer)
 December 13 – Dieter Eilts (German international footballer and manager)

Deaths

October 
 October 6 – Pietro Serantoni, Italian midfielder, winner of the 1938 FIFA World Cup. (57 ; Brain tumor).

December 
 December 13 – Pedro Petrone, Uruguayan striker, winner of the 1930 FIFA World Cup and topscorer of the 1931–32 Serie A and 1924 Summer Olympics. (59)

References

 
Association football by year